Braunstone Park is a large public park located in Braunstone, Leicester, United Kingdom.

History
Braunstone Hall, which was built as a private house in 1775, became a school in 1932.

Facilities

The park covers an area of 168 acres, has two lakes, large open spaces, woodlands and meadows. It has three formal gardens; a war memorial garden, a walled garden and an azalea garden. Facilities include a children's play area, a skate park, outdoor gyms and four football pitches. A small museum in the park opens on special occasions.  At the edge of the park is Braunstone Leisure Centre, which is run by Leicester City Council.

Parkrun
Every Saturday morning at 9am, Braunstone Park hosts a parkrun run marshalled by volunteers. The first Braunstone parkrun was held on 25 September 2010.

References

Parks and open spaces in Leicestershire